Tsu may refer to:

People 
 Tsu (surname), romanized Zu in Mandarin pinyin
 Andrew Tsu (1885–1986), Chinese Anglican bishop
 Irene Tsu (born 1944), Chinese American actress
 Raphael Tsu (born 1931), Chinese American physicist
 Susan Tsu, American costume designer

Characters 
 Tsuyu Asui, from My Hero Academia

Places 
 Tin Shui stop, a Light Rail stop in Hong Kong
 Tsu, Mie, a city in Japan
 Tsu Domain, a Japanese domain of the Edo period
 Tsu Station, in Tsu, Mie Prefecture, Japan

Universities

Georgia
 Tbilisi State University

Philippines 
 Tarlac State University

Russia
 Tambov State University
 Tomsk State University
 Tula State University

Taiwan 
 Taiwan Shoufu University

Turkmenistan
 Turkmen State University, in Ashgabat

United States
 Tarleton State University, in Stephenville, Texas
 Tennessee State University, in Nashville, Tennessee
 Texas Southern University, in Houston, Texas
 Texas State University, in San Marcos, Texas
 Trinity Southwest University, in Albuquerque, New Mexico
 Tri-State University, now Trine University, in Angola, Indiana
 Truman State University, in Kirksville, Missouri

Other uses
 Tsū, a Japanese aesthetic ideal
 Tsu (kana), つ or ツ, one of the syllables of the Japanese hiragana and katakana syllabaries
 Tsū (social network), a social networking platform now known as display!
 The Sunshine Underground, an English indie rock band
 Taiwan Solidarity Union, a political party in Taiwan
 Toy Soldiers Unite, an online community and artistic network
 Trade Services Utility, a banking initiative
 Tribal Students Union, a student organisation in Tripura, India
 Truly Strong Universities, a ranking of Japanese universities
 Tsou language, an Austronesian language of Taiwan
 "TSU" (song), by Drake from his 2021 album Certified Lover Boy